Aminul Islam (Born 13 July 1972) is an All India United Democratic Front politician from Assam. He was elected in Assam Legislative Assembly election in 2011 and 2016 from Dhing constituency.

On 6 February 2017, Islam was suspended for 3 days for live telecasting his speech on Facebook in the Assembly.

He was mocked on his idiotic comments, like he claimed that Aurangzeb donated land for Maa Kamakhya temple.

References 

Living people
All India United Democratic Front politicians
Assam MLAs 2011–2016
Assam MLAs 2016–2021
People from Nagaon district
1972 births